Cyperus michelianus is a species of sedge that is native to parts of Europe, Asia, Africa and Australia. It grows in wet habitats such as river margins and paddy fields.

See also 
 List of Cyperus species

References 

michelianus
Plants described in 1813
Flora of Western Australia
Flora of South Australia
Flora of the Northern Territory
Flora of Victoria (Australia)
Flora of New South Wales
Flora of Queensland
Flora of Afghanistan
Flora of Algeria
Flora of Assam (region)
Flora of Austria
Flora of Bangladesh
Flora of Belarus
Flora of Bulgaria
Flora of Cambodia
Flora of Chad
Flora of China
Flora of the Republic of the Congo
Flora of Corsica
Flora of Czechoslovakia
Flora of Russia
Flora of Egypt
Flora of Ethiopia
Flora of France
Flora of Gabon
Flora of Germany
Flora of Ghana
Flora of Greece
Flora of Hungary
Flora of India
Flora of Mongolia
Flora of Iraq
Flora of Italy
Flora of Indonesia
Flora of Japan
Flora of Kazakhstan
Flora of Kenya
Taxa named by Alire Raffeneau Delile